Global Warning may refer to:
 Global Warning (Jon Oliva's Pain album), 2008
 Global Warning (Rascalz album), 1999
 Global Warning, Turmion Kätilöt album, 2020
 WWE Global Warning, 2002 WWE tour of Australia

See also
Global warming